Saketh Myneni and Divij Sharan were the defending champions but chose not to defend their title.

Marco Chiudinelli and Marius Copil won the title after defeating Sadio Doumbia and Calvin Hemery 6–4, 6–4 in the final.

Seeds

Draw

References
 Main Draw

Turk Telecom Izmir Cup - Doubles
2016 Türk Telecom İzmir Cup